Nomula is a village and a Gram panchayat of Nalgonda mandal, Nalgonda district, in Telangana state.

References

2. ^ https://web.archive.org/web/20081014035116/http://www.orkut.co.in/main#Community?cmm=22753880
Villages in Nalgonda district